The 1923 Arizona Wildcats football team represented the University of Arizona as an independent during the 1923 college football season. In their ninth season under head coach Pop McKale, the Wildcats compiled a 5–3 record and outscored their opponents, 146 to 127. The team captain was Marvin Carl Clark.

Schedule

References

Arizona
Arizona Wildcats football seasons
Arizona Wildcats football